TDBzcholine is a diazirine analog of acetylcholine that can be used to label the nicotinic acetylcholine receptor.

Mechanism of action
TDBzcholine is able to bind to the nicotinic acetylcholine receptor. Once TDBzcholine is bound to the receptor, TDBzcholine can be activated by exposing the sample to UV light. This led to formation of a highly reactive carbene radical that can react with amino acid residues in the receptor and become covalently bound to the receptor.

See also
Photoaffinity labeling

References

Diazirines
Choline esters
Benzoate esters
Trifluoromethyl compounds
Nicotinic acetylcholine receptors